Owa or OWA may refer to:
 Owa language, a language of the Solomon Islands
 Ōwa, an era in Japanese history
 Owa Obokun Adimula, the title of the traditional ruler of the Ijesha people of Nigeria 
 Owa (dance), a traditional dance of Tripura, India
 Owa, a variant of Oba (ruler), a Nigeria title for a ruler, used among the Ijesha

Acronyms
 Open Web Analytics, open source web analytics software
 Open World Assumption, formal reasoning with incomplete knowledge
 Optimized wideband array antenna, a type of Yagi–Uda antenna
 Ordered weighted averaging aggregation operator, a class of operator used in fuzzy logic
 Outlook Web App, a web-based email client, now part of Outlook on the web
 Open Wireless Architecture, an element of 4G cellular phone technology
 One Woman Army (disambiguation)